The following lists events that happened during 1913 in New Zealand.

Incumbents

Regal and viceregal
 Head of State — George V
 Governor — Arthur Foljambe, 2nd Earl of Liverpool

Government
The 18th New Zealand Parliament continues, with the Reform Party in government.

Speaker of the House — Arthur Guinness (Liberal) until 10 June, then Frederic Lang (Reform Party) from 26 June
Prime Minister — William Massey
Minister of Finance — James Allen

Parliamentary opposition
 Leader of the Opposition — Joseph Ward (Liberal Party) from 13 September.

Judiciary
 Chief Justice – Robert Stout

Main centre leaders
 Mayor of Auckland — James Parr
 Mayor of Wellington — John Luke
 Mayor of Christchurch — Henry Holland
 Mayor of Dunedin — John Wilson, then William Downie Stewart Jr

Events 
22 March: The world's first automatic totalisator is used at the Easter meeting at Ellerslie Racecourse in Auckland.
13 April: Frederik E. Sandford flies the rebuilt biplane Manurewa at the Avondale Racecourse. The Manurewa was formerly owned and flown by the Walsh Brothers before it crashed (see 1911) but is now owned by a syndicate and been rebuilt by Sandford and William Miller.
24 April: "Wizard" Stone flies for an estimated  from Alexandra Park.
April or May: Frederik Sandford flies the first woman passenger in New Zealand, a Miss Lester.
9 July: The first suspected case in a Smallpox outbreak is reported. It is later confirmed and the outbreak becomes an epidemic. 
22 October: Wellington watersiders go on strike.
23 October: Wellington watersiders are locked out sparking nationwide waterfront strikes.
29 October: Over 1000 Wellington strikers hold a protest meeting at the Basin Reserve.
30 October: The first "special constables" arrive in Wellington.
8 November: "Special constables" occupy Auckland wharves leading to a general strike.
10 November: A general strike is called in Wellington but it is not supported.
23 November: The general strike in Auckland ends.
1 December: Auckland Exhibition opens.
20 December: Wellington waterfront strike is called off.

Undated

Arthur Schaef makes short powered hops in his second, unnamed, aircraft, at Lyall Bay, Wellington.
Hector and Seaforth McKenzie fly their Hamilton biplane at Marton.
Percy Fisher and Reginald White fly an aircraft of their own design at Greytown. The event is also filmed.

Arts and literature

See 1913 in art, 1913 in literature, :Category:1913 books

Music

See: 1913 in music

Film
Hinemoa — first New Zealand feature film, made by Gaston Méliès 
How Chief Te Ponga Won His Bride – also by Gaston Méliès and the Star Film Company 
Loved by a Maori Chieftess- also by Gaston Méliès and the Star Film Company 
The River Wanganui – one of five short films made in New Zealand by Gaston Méliès and the Star Film Company
See: 1913 in film, List of New Zealand feature films, Cinema of New Zealand, :Category:1913 films, :Category:1913 film awards

Sport

Chess
 The 26th National Chess Championship was held in Nelson, and was won by J.C. Grierson of Auckland, his second title.

Golf

Men's
 The seventh New Zealand Open championship was won by Ted Douglas.
 The 21st National Amateur Championships were held in Otago 
 Matchplay: B.B. Wood (Christchurch) — 2nd title

Women's
 Matchplay:  Mrs. G Williams.
 Strokeplay: Mrs G. Williams – 3rd title

Horse racing

Harness racing
 New Zealand Trotting Cup: Ravenschild 
 Auckland Trotting Cup: Jewel Chimes

Thoroughbred racing

Rugby league
New Zealand national rugby league team

Rugby union
 Auckland defend the Ranfurly Shield against Wellington (6–5) and Poverty Bay (27–3) before losing it to Taranaki (11–14)

Soccer
Provincial league champions:
	Auckland:	Everton Auckland
	Canterbury:	Sydenham
	Hawke's Bay:	Waipukurau
	Otago:	Kaitangata FC
	Southland:	Rangers
	Wanganui:	Eastbrooke
	Wellington:	Wellington Thistle

Tennis
 Anthony Wilding is ranked the world's No.1 player and records a unique triple, winning world championships in hard court, lawn and indoor.

Births

January
 6 January – Bill Broughton, jockey
 8 January – Dennis Smith, cricketer
 12 January – Jack Taylor, rugby union player, coach and administrator
 13 January – Norman Henderson, cricketer
 17 January – Arthur Cutler, cricketer
 18 January – Douglas Dalton, rugby union player
 19 January – Henry Waine, cricketer
 31 January – Jim Blandford, cricketer

February
 2 February – Harry Wigley, pilot, tourism industry leader
 13 February – Minden Blake, World War II flying ace, inventor
 15 February
 Jean Horsley, artist
 Helmut Rex, Presbyterian theologian
 18 February – Nola Millar, theatre director
 20 February – Helen Shaw, short-story writer, poet, editor
 24 February – Rowan Nicks, surgeon

March
 5 March – Athol Rafter, nuclear chemist
 11 March – Eric Gowing, Anglican bishop
 23 March – Nancy Northcroft, town planner

April
 2 April
 Angus McDougall, cricketer
 Beth Zanders, artist
 8 April – Ron Stone, association footballer
 9 April  – Vincent McCarten, cricketer
 13 April – Ronald Tinker, soldier, scientific administrator
 22 April
 Ted Dunning, cricketer
 Kenneth J. McNaught, philatelist
 28 April – Phil Hawksworth, badminton player
 30 April – John Kavanagh, Roman Catholic bishop

May
 4 May – Bill Laney, politician
 5 May – John Denvir, soldier
 6 May – Douglas Stewart, poet
 9 May – Alfred Cobden, cricketer
 13 May – John Miles, microbiologist, epidemiologist
 16 May – Norman Davis, English language and literature academic
 18 May – Hono Denham, cricketer
 19 May – Artie Combes, cricketer
 23 May – Charlie Saxton, cricket, rugby union player, coach and administrator
 25 May – Gordon Jolly, lawn bowls player
 27 May – Allan Highet, politician
 31 May – Dave Solomon, rugby union and rugby league player

June
 4 June – Tom Pearce, rugby union player and administrator, businessman, politician
 5 June – Alan Brash, Presbyterian minister
 12 June – Ruth France, poet, novelist
 19 June – Peter Donkin, World War II pilot
 28 June – Bill Gwynne, cricket umpire
 30 June – Percy Allen, politician

July
 12 July – Rufus Rogers, doctor, politician
 13 July – Len Newell, swimmer
 14 July – Claude Clegg, javelin thrower
 15 July – Terry McLean, sports journalist
 18 July – Stephen Peter Llewellyn, soldier, historian, writer
 21 July – Betty Molesworth Allen, botanist
 26 July – Howard Benge, rower
 27 July – Charles Bennett, broadcaster, soldier, diplomat
 28 July – Tom Morrison, rugby union player and administrator
 31 July – George Wallace, cricketer

August
 6 August – Oscar Wrigley, cricketer
 8 August – Clement Randall, cricketer
 11 August – Reginald Cook, cricketer
 20 August
 Desmond Dunnet, cricketer
 Vi Farrell, cricketer
 21 August – Ken Uttley, cricketer, pathologist
 23 August – Nikola Nobilo, winemaker
 24 August – Johannes La Grouw – architect, engineer, businessman
 29 August – Len Butterfield, cricketer

September
 1 September
 Dan Davin, author
 Jean Mitchell, netball player
 2 September – Mick Borrie, demographer
 3 September – Malcolm Lohrey, cricketer
 5 September – Nancy Browne, cricketer
 6 September – Ron Ulmer, cyclist
 12 September – Alastair Monteath, cricketer
 13 September – Oswald Cheesman, musician
 15 September – Russell Aitken, air force officer
 21 September – Robertson Stewart, industrialist
 25 September – Clare Mallory, children's author 
 28 September
 Maurice Browne, cricketer
 Haane Manahi, soldier

October
 1 October – Ken Cumberland, geographer, politician
 3 October – Ruth Symons, cricketer
 8 October – J. Graham Miller, Presbyterian missionary
 17 October – Norman Ellis, cricketer
 19 October – John Anderson, rugby league player
 25 October
 John Charters, rower
 Mabel Corby, cricketer
 31 October – Roy Calvert, World War II pilot

November
 5 November – Pat Devanny, political activist
 7 November – Ruth Mason, botanist
 13 November – Bill Young, politician
 16 November – Wilfred Brimble, rugby league player
 22 November – Neville Mitchell, rugby union player and coach
 24 November – Geoff Baylis, botanist

December
 3 December – John Mitchell, physicist
 4 December – Yvonne Lawley, actor
 11 December – Robert Grotte, rugby league player
 13 December – Rudolf Gopas, artist, art teacher
 19 December – Bill Pullar, athlete
 21 December – George Giles, cyclist

Deaths

January–March
 17 January – John Bryce, politician (born 1833)
 18 January – Elizabeth Horrell, schoolteacher (born 1826)
 22 January – Alexander Brown, marine engineer (born 1830)
 29 January – William Webb, cricketer (born 1872)
 4 February – Kate Wyllie, Rongowhakaata leader (born )
 21 February – John Hoyte, artist (born 1835)
 6 March – Margaret Ralph, businesswoman (born )
 10 March – George Clarke, pioneer, educationalist (born 1823)
 19 March – Eleanor Smith, suffragist, magazine editor (born 1828)

April–June
 6 April – Herbert Slade, boxer (born 1851)
 16 April – Thomas Gapes, politician (born 1848)
 17 April – Edward Broad, cricketer (born 1875)
 19 April – John Tiffin Stewart, civil engineer, surveyor (born 1827)
 20 May – Harry Moffatt, harbourmaster, writer (born 1839)
 23 May – Edward Lewis, Church of Christ evangelist (born 1831)
 25 May – Fanny Cole, temperance leader, women's rights advocate (born 1860)
 3 June – Philip Philips, politician (born 1831)
 10 June – Sir Arthur Guinness, politician (born 1846)
 14 June – George Dickinson, cricket player and umpire (born 1828)
 19 June – Henry Sawtell, politician (born 1832)
 29 June – John Bush, cricketer (born 1867)

July–September
 25 July – George Swan, politician, photographer (born 1833)
 29 July – Samuel Jackson, solicitor (born 1831)
 3 August – James Pope, teacher, school inspector, writer (born 1837)
 30 August – Dudley Ward, politician, judge (born 1827)
 21 September –Trevor Grierson, cricketer (born 1849)
 24 September
 Andrew Loughrey, politician (born 1844)
 Sir William Russell, politician (born 1838)
 30 September – Ānaha Te Rāhui, Ngāti Tarāwhai leader, carver (born 1822)

October–December
 12 October – Augustus Hamilton, ethologist, biologist, museum director (born 1853)
 27 October – Henry Wynn-Williams, politician, lawyer (born 1828)
 10 November – Henry Morrison, cricketer (born 1850)
 11 November – Petrus Van der Velden, painter (born 1837)
 19 November – George Laurenson, politician (born 1857)
 29 November – Samuel Lister, newspaper proprietor and editor (born )
 11 December – Charles Gore, cricketer (born 1871)
 29 December – Thomas Adamson, soldier, New Zealand Cross recipient (born 1845)

See also
List of years in New Zealand
Timeline of New Zealand history
History of New Zealand
Military history of New Zealand
Timeline of the New Zealand environment
Timeline of New Zealand's links with Antarctica

References

External links

 
Years of the 20th century in New Zealand